Karl Jacob (born January 20, 1979) is an American actor and filmmaker known for writing and directing the feature films Pollywogs and Cold November, as well as producing the Onur Tukel film Applesauce.

Personal life
Karl Jacob was born and raised in Hibbing, Minnesota. He currently resides in North Carolina.

Filmography

Actor

Awards
Cold November received the Grand Jury award for Best Narrative Feature at the IndieMemphis Film Festival in 2017.

References

External links

American film directors
American actors
American male screenwriters
Filmmakers from Minnesota
Living people
1979 births